The Jungfrau Railway (JB) is a mountain railway in the Bernese Alps, Switzerland, connecting Kleine Scheidegg in the Bernese Oberland to the Jungfraujoch, across the Valais border. It is the highest railway in Switzerland and Europe, running  from the station of Kleine Scheidegg to the Jungfraujoch, well above the perennial snow line. As a consequence, the railway runs essentially within the Jungfrau Tunnel, built into the neighbouring Eiger and Mönch, to protect the line from snow and extreme weather.

The Jungfrau Railway got its name from the highest of the three high peaks above it: the Jungfrau, which was the initial goal of the project. A lift connecting the summit of the Jungfrau with an underground railway was planned. In 1912, the project ultimately ended at the Jungfraujoch, the saddle between the Mönch and Jungfrau. It was one of the highest railways in the world at the time of its inauguration.

At Kleine Scheidegg the Jungfrau Railway connects with the Wengernalpbahn (WAB), which has two routes down the mountain, running respectively to the villages of Lauterbrunnen and Grindelwald. From both villages, branches of the Berner Oberland-Bahn (BOB) connect to the Swiss Federal Railways at Interlaken.

The line is owned by the Jungfraubahn AG, a subsidiary of the Jungfraubahn Holding AG, a holding company that owns several mountain railways, cable railways, hotels, restaurants and travel agencies in the same region. Through that holding company it is part of the Allianz - Jungfrau Top of Europe marketing alliance, which also includes the separately owned Berner Oberland-Bahn and Schynige Platte-Bahn.

History

1860 (approximately) – Many different plans for a mountain railway on the Jungfrau exist, but fail due to financial problems.
1894 – The industrialist Adolf Guyer-Zeller receives a concession for a rack railway, which begins from the Kleine Scheidegg railway station of the Wengernalpbahn (WAB), with a long tunnel through the Eiger and Mönch up to the summit of the Jungfrau.
1896 – Construction begins. Construction work proceeds briskly.
1898 – The Jungfrau Railway opens as far as the Eigergletscher railway station, at the foot of the Eiger.
1899 – Six workers are killed in an explosion. There is a four-month strike by workers. Adolf Guyer-Zeller dies in Zürich on 3 April. The section from Eigergletscher station to Rotstock station opens on 2 August.
1903 – The section from Rotstock station to Eigerwand station opens on 28 June.
1905 – The section from Eigerwand station to Eismeer station opens on 25 July.
1908 – There is an explosion at Eigerwand station.
1912 – On 21 February, sixteen years after work commenced, the tunneling crew finally breaks through the glacier in Jungfraujoch. Jungfraujoch station is inaugurated on 1 August.
1924 – "The house above the clouds" at Jungfraujoch is opened on 14 September.
1931 – The research station at the Jungfraujoch is opened.
1937 – The Sphinx Observatory is opened. A snowblower is purchased, resulting in year-round operation.
1942 – Company offices are relocated from Zürich to Interlaken.
1950 – The dome is installed on the Sphinx Observatory.
1951 – The adhesion section between Eismeer station and Jungfraujoch station is converted to rack operation.
1955 – A second depot at Kleine Scheidegg is constructed. The post office inaugurates its relay station on the Jungfraujoch.
1972 – The panoramic windows are installed at Eigerwand and Eismeer. The Jungfraujoch mountain house and tourist house are destroyed by fire on 21 October.
1975 – A new tourist house is opened.
1987 – A new mountain house is opened on 1 August.
1991 – A new station hall is opened at the Jungfraujoch.
1993 – The small Kleine Scheidegg depot is extended.
1996 – The covered observation deck at the Sphinx Observatory is opened.
1997 – The number of annual visitors exceeds 500,000 for the first time.
2000 – On 1 June, a daily record number of 8,148 visitors is achieved.

Operations
The Jungfrau Railway has five operational stations. The base station hub of Kleine Scheidegg is the highest starting point for a railroad in Europe, and the top terminus of Jungfraujoch is the highest railway station in Europe. The initial open-air section culminates just after Eigergletscher (2,320 m), at around 2,350 metres, which makes the line the second highest open-air railway in Switzerland. The two other stations are located in the Jungfrau Tunnel, where passengers can disembark for a short time to observe the neighbouring mountains through windows built into the mountainside. The lower one, Eigerwand, gives access to windows in the north face of the Eiger. The upper one, Eismeer, gives access to windows in the east face of the Eiger, overlooking the Eismeer (the "sea of ice").

Stations 

Kleine Scheidegg, 
Eigergletscher, 
Eigerwand, 
Eismeer, 
Jungfraujoch, 

Source:

Characteristics 

The Jungfrau Railway is electrified and one of only four lines in the world with three-phase electric power. The line runs using a 3-phase alternating current (AC) system which requires the trains to collect power from twin overhead wires using two pantographs (the third phase is earthed to the track).

Lift proposal and aerial cableway 
In early 2008, Jungfraubahn Holding AG announced it was exploring the idea of an efficient fast form of access to the Jungfraujoch, using the world's longest tunnel-lift system, as an alternative to the rack railway. A feasibility study was undertaken to determine if and how such a system—for example, as a fast lift or funicular—from the Lauterbrunnen Valley to the Jungfraujoch could be realised without disturbing the unique landscape of the UNESCO World Heritage Site. This aerial cableway, known as the Eiger Express, opened to the public on 5 December 2020 and provides an alternative, faster way to access the Jungfraujoch from the valley.

Rolling stock

Since most of the railway is inside a tunnel, it was designed to be powered by electricity from conception. The current rolling stock consists of twin-unit motorcoaches carrying up to 230 people per train which operate at 12.5 km/h on the steepest parts of the ascent. The motors function at two speeds which allows the units to operate at double this speed on the less steep part of the ascent (above Eismeer station).

The motors operate in a regenerative mode which allows the trains to generate electricity during the descent, which is fed back into the power distribution system. Approximately 50% of the energy required for an ascent is recovered during the descent. This generation regulates the descent speed.

Motive power delivered since 1992 (numbers 211–224) no longer has directly-fed three-phase motors but is equipped similarly to a normal single-phase locomotive. This rolling stock can travel at variable speeds, which enabled a reduction in journey time from 52 to 35 min with the timetable starting 11 December 2016. Pre-1992 rolling stock can no longer be used in regular traffic and most of the earlier trains have been scrapped.

Snow clearing equipment is essential on the open section of line between Kleine Scheidegg railway station and Eigergletscher railway station. Originally snow ploughs were used, but more recently snow blowing equipment has been brought into service.

The railway also operates some dedicated freight vehicles to supply the visitor facilities at Jungfraujoch, including a tank to transport additional water.

See also
 List of mountain railways in Switzerland
 Rail transport in Switzerland
 Wetterhorn Elevator, another ambitious project in the region aiming at the Wetterhorn

Notes

References

External links

 Jungfrau Railways website 
 Jungfraurailway: Why the highest of Europe didn't end higher 'Tim Travel' on YouTube 
 "Alpine Climbing by Railroad" Popular Mechanics, December 1911, pp. 830–831.

Transport in the Alps
Bernese Oberland
Mountain railways
Metre gauge railways in Switzerland
Railway companies of Switzerland
Electric railways in Switzerland
Railway lines in Switzerland
Railways using three-phase power
Railway lines opened in 1898
Rack railways in Switzerland
Transport in the canton of Bern
Transport in Valais
Tourist attractions in the Canton of Bern
1898 establishments in Switzerland
Companies listed on the SIX Swiss Exchange